Robert Mace (born 12 August 1958) is a former Australian rules footballer who played for Hawthorn, St Kilda and the Brisbane Bears in the Victoria Football League (VFL) during the 1980s.

Originally from Frankston YCW, Mace started his VFL career at Hawthorn in 1980 but was unable establish himself as a senior player there so crossed to St Kilda in 1982 where he became a regular in the side for five seasons.

Mace was offloaded to the league's new club, Brisbane, in 1987 but he would only make one appearance. He represented Queensland at the 1988 Adelaide Bicentennial Carnival before returning to Victoria and finishing his career with Victorian Football Association (VFA) team Frankston, whom he also coached until 2002.

On 5 August 2015 it was reported that Mace was suspended from Frankston following a fight with a Frankston official at a VFL match the previous weekend.

References

Holmesby, Russell and Main, Jim (2007). The Encyclopedia of AFL Footballers. 7th ed. Melbourne: Bas Publishing. 

1958 births
Living people
Brisbane Bears players
Hawthorn Football Club players
St Kilda Football Club players
Frankston Football Club players
Australian rules footballers from Victoria (Australia)